Krisztián Cser (pronounced [kristiaːn t͡ʃɛr]) (born 9 December 1977) is a Hungarian operatic and concert singer (bass) and physicist, the soloist of the Hungarian State Opera.

Biography 
Krisztián Cser was born in 1977, in Szeged, Hungary. He grew up in a family of musicians. His grandmother Tímea Cser was a soprano, grandfather Gusztáv Cser was a composer-conductor, father Miklós Cser was a conductor. His mother Andrea Balló is a painter. He has 5 siblings. One of his brothers, Ádám Cser is a musician too, he is a composer-conductor. He grew up in Szeged, Hungary, where he began his musical studies by playing the piano in his early childhood. After leaving high school, he graduated in physics at the University of Szeged in 2002 (Hungary) and began to work as a PhD student at the Institute of Biophysics of the Szeged Biological Research Centre. But his artistic roots proved strong, science was replaced by music in his life. He studied classical singing at the University of Szeged, where his vocal trainer was István Andrejcsik, then he attended the Department of Vocal and Opera Studies at the Liszt Academy, where the famous operatic singer Éva Marton was his professor and studied stage movement and acting with Balázs Kovalik.

Krisztián Cser succeeded in several Hungarian and international singing competitions, either he got into the finals, got a special prize, or even won.

He came out as an oratorio soloist in J. S. Bach's Saint John Passion in 1998. His repertoire includes a wide range of musical styles from early baroque to contemporary music. In opera roles he appeared first in 2008, since when he has been a member of the Hungarian State Opera. His first lead role at the Hungarian State Opera was Pomádé in Ránki's King Pomádé's New Clothes. He has sung under the baton of renowned Hungarian and foreign conductors such as Pierre Cao, Péter Eötvös, Helmuth Rilling, Peter Schreier, Muhai Tang, Gábor Hollerung, Kirill Karabits, Zoltán Kocsis, Ádám Fischer, Iván Fischer, Zoltán Peskó, György Vashegyi, Ken'ichiro Kobayashi, Zsolt Hamar and Tamás Vásáry. During the years, his title-role singing in Béla Bartók's Bluebeard's Castle became emblematic, he sings it in many Hungarian and international performances successfully with the contribution of renowned conductors. In some of the countries during his tour around the world, the audience could listen to and watch this opera for the first time in his performance. Above all, on the CD published in 2018 for the centenary of the Bluebeard's Castle premiere, Krisztián Cser sings Bluebeard.

Besides Bartók's opera, he has played other remarkable roles on opera stages. He frequently sings the bass roles of Mozart's operas as Figaro, Leporello and Sarastro, and authentically plays the protagonists in Verdi and Wagner's operas, such as The Grand Inquisitor and Philip II in Don Carlos or Wotan in The Rhinegold. His other leading roles have included Colline in Puccini's La bohème and Don Basilio in Rossini's The Barber of Seville. His ever-expanding repertoire includes more than 60 operas and nearly 80 roles.

He regularly performs on Hungarian opera and concert stages. He gave recitals also at the Royal Festival Hall in London, at the Elbphilharmonie in Hamburg and many more famous concert hall. He has debut as Wotan in Wagner's The Rhinegold in 2018, and as Don Pizarro in Beethoven's Fidelio at the Opernhaus Chemnitz. In 2019 he sang the role of Bluebeard with the Budapest Festival Orchestra conducted by Iván Fischer, at Carnegie Hall in New York City. He also sang the role of Wotan in the fall of 2019 in Mexico City, where the 150th anniversary of the staging of Wagner's The Rhinegold was celebrated.

Career 

1998: first professional appearance as an oratorio soloist | J. S. Bach: St John Passion
2002: graduate as physicist at the University of Szeged
2006: graduate at the College of Music in Szeged
2008: graduate at the Liszt Academy of Music in Budapest
2008: debut as Don Magnifico | Rossini: La Cenerentola | Italy (Spoleto)
2008: the first lead at the Hungarian State Opera: Pomádé | Ránki: King Pomádé's New Clothes
2010-: guest artist of the Hungarian State Opera
2014: Bluebeard | Béla Bartók: Bluebeard's Castle | China, Ukraine (Kyiv)
2014: debut as Figaro | Mozart : The Marriage of Figaro, Hungary (Budapest)
2014: Kossuth | Iván Fischer: The Red Heifer,
2014: tour in Germany with the Budapest Festival Orchestra
2015: Bluebeard | Béla Bartók: Bluebeard's Castle, Italy (Milan)
2016: Sarastro | Mozart: The Magic Flute | Royal Festival Hall, United Kingdom (London) | Konzerthaus Berlin, Germany, Concertgebouw - Netherlands (Amsterdam) | Concertgebouw, Bruges, Belgium
2017: Bluebeard | Béla Bartók: Bluebeard's Castle | Royal Festival Hall, United Kingdom (London) | Concert Hall, Poland (Katowice) | Concertgebouw, Bruges, Belgium
2018: debut as Wotan | Wagner: The Rhinegold | Germany (Chemnitz)
2019: debut as Alvise Badoero / Ponchielli: La Gioconda, Hungary (Budapest)
2019: tour with the Budapest Festival Orchestra | Bluebeard | Béla Bartók: Bluebeard's Castle | Elbphilharmonie, Germany (Hamburg)  | Philharmonie de Paris, Paris-Grande salle Pierre Boulez, France (Paris) | Philharmonie Luxembourg, Luxemburg (Luxembourg) | Carnegie Hall, United States of America (New York City)
2019: debut as Don Pizarro | Beethoven: Fidelio, Germany (Chemnitz)
2019: Wotan | Wagner: The Rhinegold | Sala Nezahualcoyotl, Mexico, (Mexico City)
2020: debut as Philip II | Verdi: Don Carlos | National Theatre of Miskolc, Hungary (Miskolc)

Awards and scholarship 

 Róbert Kovács Philharmony Scholarship 2003
 Albert Szent-Györgyi Scholarship 2005
 Annie Fischer Scholarship 2007
 Hungarian State Opera Scholarship 2008-2010
 "Youth of March" 2010
 Wagner Society Scholarship 2011
 Mihály Székely Commemorative Medallion 2013
 Hungarian Silver Cross of Merit 2014
 Gusztáv Oláh Commemorative Medallion 2016
 Hungarian Gold Cross of Merit 2020
 György Melis Award 2021

Music competitions 
4th Simándy József National Singing Competition | 2nd category - Winner (2004)
Montserrat Caballe Singing Competition | Finals (2008)
Geneva International Music Competition - Special Prize (2009)

Discography

Opera

Oratorio, song

Filmography

Opera film

Concert film

Opera roles

Bartók: Bluebeard's Castle
Bluebeard
Beethoven: Fidelio
Rocco
Don Fernando
Pizzaro
Bizet: Carmen
Zuniga
Britten: The Rape of Lucretia
Collatinus
Donizetti: L'elisir d'amore
Dulcamara
Donizetti: Anna Bolena
Enrico (Henry VIII)
Lord Rochefort
Donizetti: Lucia di Lammermoor
Raimondo Bidebent
Eötvös: Love and Other Demons
Don Toribio
Erkel: Hunyadi László
Ulrik Cillei
Erkel: Dózsa György
Bagos
Friar Laurence
Fischer: The red heifer
Kossuth
Gounod: Roméo et Juliette
Frère Laurent
Händel: Deidamia
Licomede
Händel: Semele
Cadmus
Haydn: L'anima del filosofo ossia Orfeo ed Euridice
Plutone
Hubay: The Violin Maker of Cremona
Ferrari, a master violin maker
Lendvay: The Respectful Prostitute 
The negro
Monteverdi: L'Orfeo
Caronte
Plutone
Monteverdi: The Coronation of Poppaea
Ottone
Mozart: The Magic Flute
Sarastro
Second priest
Mozart: Don Giovanni
Leporello
Il Commendatore
Mozart: The Marriage of Figaro
Figaro
Bartolo
Antonio
Count Almaviva
Mozart: Idomeneo
The voice of the Oracle of Neptune
Mozart: La clemenza di Tito
Publio
Ponchielli: La Gioconda
Alvise Badoero
Puccini: La bohème
Colline
Puccini: Gianni Schicchi
Marco
Ser Amantio di Nicolao
Puccini: Tosca
Cesare Angelotti 
Purcell: The Fairy-Queen
Drunken Poet
Rameau: Hippolyte et Aricie
Pluton
Neptune
Ravel: L'enfant et les sortilèges
Le fauteuil
L'arbre
Ránki: King Pomádé's New Clothes
Pomádé
Rossini: The Barber of Seville
Don Basilio
Rossini: La Cenerentola
Don Magnifico
Sári: Sonnenfinsternis
Miklós Radnóti
Selmeczi: The Spiritists
Il Duca
Schönberg: Moses and Aron
Priest
Smetana: The Bartered Bride
Kecal
Strauss: The Silent Woman
Farfallo
Strauss: Ariadne on Naxos
Truffaldino
Strauss: Daphne
Peneios
Strauss: Elektra
Orest's tutor
Strauss: Piece Day
The Holsteiner
Strauss: Salome
First soldier
First Nazarene
Stravinsky: Oedipus rex
Tiresias
Tihanyi: The white rose
The man
Vajda: Mario and the Magician
Cipolla
Verdi: Aida
The King of Egypt
Verdi: Attila
Leone
Verdi: Don Carlos
Philip II
Charles V
The Grand Inquisitor
Verdi: The Sicilian Vespers
Count Vaudemont
Verdi: Otello
Lodovico
Verdi: Rigoletto
Sparafucile
Verdi: Simon Boccanegra
Jacopo Fiesco
Verdi: Stiffelio
Jorg 
Verdi: The Troubadour
Ferrando
Verdi: A Masked Ball
Samuel
Wagner: The Rhinegold
Wotan
Fasolt
Wagner: Rienzi
Raimondo
Wagner: Siegfried
The Wanderer
Wagner: The Valkyrie
Hunding
Wagner: Tannhäuser
Reinmar von Zweter
Hermann
Weber: The Freeshooter
Kaspar
Weill: Rise and Fall of the City of Mahagonny
Joe, called Alaskawolfjoe

References

External links
  Official site of the artist
  Site of Hungarian State Opera

1977 births
Living people
21st-century Hungarian male opera singers
Operatic basses
Musicians from Budapest
People from Szeged
Franz Liszt Academy of Music alumni